Jorge de Lemos (born in Lisbon) was a Portuguese clergyman and bishop for the Roman Catholic Diocese of Funchal. He was appointed bishop in 1556. He died in 1585.

References 

1585 deaths
Portuguese Roman Catholic bishops